Trochulus villosulus is a species of air-breathing land snail, a terrestrial pulmonate gastropod mollusk in the family Hygromiidae, the hairy snails and their allies.

Distribution 
This species is known to occur in:
 Ukraine

References

Hygromiidae
Gastropods described in 1838